James Elliott (born December 20, 1976) is an American electronic musician, usually releasing solo material under the alias Ateleia. The name comes from Ateleia, a legume or from ancient Greek meaning tax-free. The music is electronic psychedelic minimalism.

Elliott was the co-founder (along with David Daniell) of the record label Antiopic. He was a former member of New York-based bands School of Seven Bells and Bear in Heaven, playing bass guitar and computer in both bands. Elliott is currently a member of the band Test House.

Discography

Solo works as Ateleia

Albums/EPs 
Nightly - Radium/Table of the Elements CD/EP, 2007
Formal Sleep - Xeric/Table of the Elements CD, 2007With contributions by David Grubbs (Gastr del Sol), David Daniell, Jon Philpot (Presocratics, Bear in Heaven) and Sadek Bazaraa (Bear in Heaven).
Swimming Against The Moments - Antiopic CD, 2004

Compilation Appearances 
"Along A Space Diagonal" on "88 Tapes" - Kesh CD, 2008
"Grasses" on Impala Eardrums - Radium/Table of the Elements LP/CD, 2008
"Inman Division (Reynoldstown Pastoral)" - Tu M'p3 MP3, 2003
"Demystifying In Order To Mystify Better" on Deconstructive Music - More Mars 3xCD, 2007
"The Sun Sets On Critical Distance" on The Allegorical Power Series Volume IV - Antiopic MP3, 2003
"We Become A Threat" on The Allegorical Power Series Volume I - Antiopic MP3, 2003

Collaborations 
Ateleia and Benjamin Curtis: Baghdad Batterie - Table of the Elements LP, 2008
School of Seven Bells: Face To Face On High Places - Radium/Table of the Elements LP, 2007
Bear in Heaven: Red Bloom of the Boom - Hometapes CD, 2007
Ateleia and David Daniell: "FTP" on The Wire Tapper 12 - Wire Magazine CD, 2004
Ateleia and David Daniell: "Fuck The Polis" on The Allegorical Power Series Volume VII - Antiopic MP3, 2003
Project Qua Project (Ateleia and David Daniell): "For Rachel Corrie" on The Allegorical Power Series Volume II - Antiopic MP3, 2003

External links 
ateleia.com, official website

Nightly review at BoomKat

American electronic musicians
1976 births
Living people
21st-century American bass guitarists